Michael Harrison is an American contemporary classical music composer and pianist living in New York City. He was a Guggenheim Fellow for the academic year 2018–2019.

Early years
Born in Bryn Mawr, PA, Harrison grew up in Eugene, OR, where his father, David Kent Harrison was a professor of mathematics at the University of Oregon and a Guggenheim Fellow for the academic year 1963–1964. As a child and teenager, he spent summers in both Chatham and Concord, MA with his grandfather, George R. Harrison, a professor of experimental physics at the Massachusetts Institute of Technology (1930), and Dean of Science (1942–64).

He studied piano from the age of 6, composition from the age of 17, and North Indian classical vocal music from the age of 18, and attended Phillips Academy Andover. Early passions also included backpacking and mountain climbing in the Oregon Cascades and Himalayas, downhill and cross-country skiing, and chess. He graduated from the University of Oregon with a B.M. in Composition, where he later received the Distinguished Alumnus of the Year Award, and then moved to New York City to study with La Monte Young through a Dia Art Foundation Apprenticeship-in Residency. He later received an M.M. in composition from the Manhattan School of Music, studying with Reiko Fueting.

Career 
In 1986, Harrison designed and produced the "harmonic piano", an extensively modified grand piano with the ability to play 24 notes per octave. Critic Kyle Gann referred to it as "an indisputable landmark in the history of Western tuning". The instrument is described in the second edition of the Grove Dictionary of Musical Instruments.

Harrison has been a serious student of Indian music, first as a disciple of master Indian vocalist Pandit Pran Nath (1979–1996), and currently, a protégé of Ustad Mashkoor Ali Khan (1999–present). He is also the co-founder and president of the American Academy of Indian Classical Music (AAICM).

Academic appointments 
Harrison has been on faculty at the Rhode Island School of Design, Manhattan School of Music’s Contemporary Performance Program, and the Bang on a Can Summer Institute at MASS MoCA. He is music director at Arts, Letters & Numbers.

Discography
2021 Seven Sacred Names, (Cantaloupe Music 21157)
2020 Just Constellations, Roomful of Teeth (New Amsterdam Records)
2018 For this from that will be filled, Clarice Jensen (Miasmah Recordings 041)
2017 Histories, Sophia Subbayya Vastek (Innova Recordings 974)
2016 Harmonic Constellations, Mari Kimura (New World Records 80776–2)
2012 Time Loops with cellist Maya Beiser (Cantaloupe Music 21086)
2012 Rumi: Lovedrunk (remastered) 
2009 The Harmonic Series – A Compilation of Works in Just Intonation (Important Records 272)
2007 Revelation: Music in Pure Intonation (Cantaloupe Music 21043)
2001 Windham Hill 25 Years of Piano (Windham Hill Records)
1992 From Ancient Worlds (New Albion Records 042)
1987 In Flight (Fortuna Records 17042–2)
1985 Windham Hill Records Piano Sampler (WH 1040)

Compositions
Time Cycles commissioned and premiered by Alarm Will Sound, Alan Pierson, conductor, Sheldon Hall, St. Louis, MO, 2019
Mureed for string quartet (commissioned and premiered by Del Sol Quartet, Pacific Pythagorean Music Festival), 2019 
Tone Rooms installation with media artist Jonathan Turner, McColl Center for Art + Innovation, 2019 
Constitution, versions for string quartet, cello and piano, violin and piano, clarinet and piano, and solo piano (premiere: Bechtler Museum of Modern Art), 2019 
Just Ancient Loops (cello octet) commissioned and premiered by Cello Octet Amsterdam, Singelkerk, Amsterdam, The Netherlands, 2018 
Cello Constellations for cello with 21 pre-recorded cello tracks and electronics (commissioned and premiered by Clarice Jensen, The Kitchen), 2017
Bairagi Bhairav for just intonation piano, Indian vocals, tabla, and optional tanpura (premiere: Carnegie Hill Concerts, Church of Advent Hope), 2017
Harmonic Constellations for violin with 13 pre-recorded violin tracks and electronics (commissioned and premiered by Mari Kimura, National Sawdust), 2016
Chorale (from Just Ancient Loops) for string orchestra (premiere: String Orchestra of Brooklyn, Roulette), 2016
Malkauns: Polyphonic Alap for Indian vocalist and pre-recorded media (commissioned by Payton MacDonald for the Sonic Divide Project and Film), 2016
Hijaz Prelude for piano with optional tabla and tanpura (premiere: Sophia Vastek, Nitin Mitta and Michael Harrison, Queens New Music Festival), 2016
Kind of Glass for piano (premiere: Michael Harrison, Queens New Music Festival), 2016
Tarana for male Indian vocalist, soprano, piano, tabla and optional tanpura, 2016
Just Constellations for vocal octet (commissioned and premiered by Roomful of Teeth at MASS MoCA), 2015, revised 2016
Radians Phase II for flute, clarinet, violin, cello and electronics (premiere: Third Sound, Havana Contemporary Music Festival), 2015
Orchestral Modules for symphony orchestra (premiere: Manhattan School of Music Composers Orchestra), 2015
Radians Phase for string quartet, two flutes and electronics (premiere: Tactus, Manhattan School of Music), 2015
Jaunpuri (Rendition of a Raga) for piano, Indian vocals, tabla and tamboura (premiere: Kimball Gallagher, Mashkoor Ali Khan, Anirban Chowdhury, Michael Harrison; Carnegie Hall), 2015; version for cello, piano and tabla, 2014
Yaman Alap for vocal octet (commissioned by Roomful of Teeth, (premiere: MASS MoCA), 2014
Yaman Tarana for vocal octet (commissioned by Roomful of Teeth, (premiere: MASS MoCA), 2014
Tessellations for chamber orchestra, countertenor, tenor, tabla and tamboura (premiere: Contemporaneous, Park Avenue Christian Church, NYC), 2014
Orchestral Modules for chamber orchestra (premiere: Contemporaneous, Park Avenue Christian Church, NYC), 2014
Piano Modules for duo piano (premiere: Allison Franzetti & Benita Meshulam) 2014; version for solo piano, 2012
Harmonic Studies in Just Intonation for computer generated sine tones, 2014
Raga Prelude No. 2 (Hijaz Bhairav) for cello and guitar (premiere: Ashley Bathgate and Mak Grgic), 2014; version for cello and piano (premiere: Maya Beiser and Michael Harrison, Atlas Center for Performing Arts), 2013
Hijaz for SATB chorus, cello, piano, tabla & percussion (commissioned by Francisco Núñez, premiere: American Choral Director's Association Director's Choir, Florida Theatre), 2013 
Revelation Remix for electronics with prepared piano in just intonation, 2013
Bhimpalasi (Rendition of a Raga) for Indian vocals, just intonation piano, cello, vibes, and tabla, 2013
Just Ancient Loops for multi-track cellos with film by Bill Morrison (commissioned by MELA Foundation, premiere: Maya Beiser, Bang on a Can Marathon), 2012
Chant for string quartet (premiere: JACK Quartet, Metropolitan Museum of Art), 2012
Bragdon's Pavillion – multi media installation with artist Loris Greaud, Centre Pompidou, 2011
Raga Prelude No. 1 (Yaman Kalyan) for cello and piano (premiere: Maya Beiser and Michael Harrison, Atlas Center for Performing Arts); versions for violin and piano; viola and piano, 2011
Hijaz for youth or women's chorus, cello, piano, tabla & percussion (commissioned by Young People's Chorus of New York City, Francisco Núñez, director; premiere: Maya Beiser, Michael Harrison, Payton MacDonald; Kaufmann Concert Hall), 2011
Tone Clouds for string quartet and just intonation piano (Revelation tuning) (premiere: Del Sol Quartet and Michael Harrison, Other Minds Festival), 2009
Revelation: Music in Pure Intonation for just intonation piano (Revelation tuning) (premiere: Michael Harrison, Klavier-Festival Ruhr), completed 2007
Wedding Song for voice and piano (premiere: Theo Bleckmann and Joshua Pierce), 2004
From Ancient Worlds for just intonation piano ("From Ancient Worlds" tuning) (premiere: Michael Harrison, Quattro Pianoforti Festival, Rome), 1992, revised 1999
Blue Camel for piano (premiere: Michael Harrison, Quattro Pianoforti Festival, Rome), 1999
For My Father for flute, violin, cello and piano, 1994
Song of the Rose for cello and piano, 1993
Symphonic Cortege for symphony orchestra (premiere: Eugene Symphony Orchestra, Marin Alsop, conductor), 1990
Birds of Paradise for jazz ensemble, 1990
1001 Nights for jazz ensemble, 1990
African Child for world music ensemble, 1988
Tactus for trumpet, piano and percussion, 1984–85
In Flight for piano, 1984
The Swan Has Flown to the Mountain Lake for flute, harp and cello, 1984; version for piano, 1983
Ecstatic poems of Rumi for soprano and piano, 1983–84
For Oboe for oboe, 1983
Reminiscent Dances for string Orchestra, 1982
Choral Work No. 1 for vocal quintet, 1981
Choral Work No. 2 for vocal quintet, 1981
Crystal Kyrie for two sopranos and 13 tuned crystal goblets (premiere: American Festival of Microtonal Music), 1979
Zikr for SATB chorus with soprano soloist, 1979
Atlantis for flute, clarinet, piano and tabla, 1979
Call of the Beloved for soprano, flute, harp and piano, 1979
Dance of the Sorcerers for flute, cello, piano, tabla and tamboura, 1978
Sonnet XVIII for alto and piano, 1977

References

Works cited

Further reading
 
 
 
 
 
 Harrison, Michael. 2007. "Revelation". Program Notes. Revelation. Various Performances. Print. 
 Harrison, Michael. 2015–16. “Just Constellations". Program Notes. Just Constellations. Various Performances. Print. 
 Harrison, Michael. 2016. "Harmonic Constellations". Program Notes. Harmonic Constellations. Various Performances, 2016. Print. 
 Huizenga, Tom, and Anastasia Tsioulcas. 2012. "Top 10 Classical Albums Of 2012". NPR (December 13). 
 
 Isacoff, Stuart. “Revelation”. Program Notes. Revelation. Various Performances, 2007. Print.

External links
 Michael Harrison Official Site
 Cantaloupe Music Artist Page

University of Oregon alumni
Manhattan School of Music alumni
Pupils of La Monte Young
Pupils of Pran Nath (musician)
American male classical composers
Contemporary classical music performers
Composers for piano
American classical composers
Postmodern composers
Minimalist composers
Microtonal composers
Electroacoustic music composers
Just intonation composers
Indian classical composers
Hindustani composers
20th-century American composers
20th-century American male musicians
20th-century classical composers
21st-century classical composers
21st-century American composers
21st-century American male musicians
Living people
Place of birth missing (living people)
1958 births